Stoneleigh may refer to:

Places

Australia 
Stoneleigh, Darlinghurst, a heritage-listed house in Sydney, New South Wales
Stoneleigh, Queensland, a locality in the Toowoomba Region

Canada
Stoneleigh, Ontario

United Kingdom 
Stoneleigh, Surrey, England
Stoneleigh, Warwickshire, England

United States 
Stoneleigh (Stanleytown, Virginia), USA, the former abode of Governor Thomas B. Stanley
Stoneleigh (Charleston, West Virginia), listed on the National Register of Historic Places in 1984
Stoneleigh: A Natural Garden, a 42-acre former estate owned by Natural Lands
Stoneleigh Historic District, Towson, Maryland

Other uses
Stoneleigh Park, an agricultural exhibition ground and conference centre in Warwickshire, England
Stoneleigh Abbey, a country mansion situated to the southwest of the village of Stoneleigh, Warwickshire, England

See also